Francisco Lacueva was a Spanish missionary, writer, theologian, teacher, pastor, and canon. He was born on 28 September 1911 in Sant Celoni.

He studied at Pontifical University of Salamanca. His field of work included dogmatic theology and Christian eschatology. He was coadjutor bishop until 1962 for Tarazona Cathedral. He worked for Strict Baptist Mission in 1969. He married Enid-Beryl Beard. His children are Francesca White, Raquel Shaddick, and Alison Cave.

He died of heart disease on 11 September 2005 in Royal United Hospital. He was buried at Malmesbury.

References

1911 births
2005 deaths
Pontifical University of Salamanca alumni
20th-century Spanish writers
Protestant writers
Baptist missionaries in Europe
Spanish Baptists
Protestant theologians
20th-century Baptists